Bahia Inglesa  ("English Bay") is a sand beach located near the port of Caldera in Atacama Region, Chile.

With a population of 135 (census 2002), it owes its name to the visit of the English privateer Edward Davis. Bahia Inglesa is renowned for its white sands and warm waters, as well as its accommodation.

References

Coasts of Atacama Region
Landforms of Atacama Region
Beaches of Chile
Populated places in Copiapó Province
Tourist attractions in Atacama Region